Chimbel is a census town in North Goa district in the state of Goa, India.

Demographics
 India census, Chimbel had a population of 11,983. Males constitute 51% of the population and females 49%. Chimbel has an average literacy rate of 61%, higher than the national average of 59.5%; with male literacy of 67% and female literacy of 54%. 14% of the population is under 6 years of age.

Location

References

Cities and towns in North Goa district